Frederick Worlock (December 14, 1886 – August 1, 1973) was a British-American actor. He is known for his work in various films during the 1940s and 1950s, and as the voice of Horace in One Hundred and One Dalmatians (1961).

Career
On stage, he made his début in 1906 in Henry V in Bristol and acted in four productions in London before moving to the United States in the 1920s, where he appeared in Broadway productions between 1923 and 1954.

From 1938 to 1966, Worlock appeared as a supporting actor in films including Man Hunt, Dr. Jekyll and Mr. Hyde, How Green Was My Valley, The Imperfect Lady, Singapore, The Lone Wolf in London, Love from a Stranger, Ruthless, Joan of Arc, Spartacus, One Hundred and One Dalmatians (voice-over), and Spinout. He appeared in a number of the Sherlock Holmes films starring Basil Rathbone in the 1940s. Worlock often portrayed "professorial roles, some benign, some villainous".

Personal life
In 1924, he married actress Elsie Ferguson, with whom he had appeared in The Moon-Flower on Broadway. The marriage ended in divorce in 1930.

Worlock died from cerebral ischemia in 1973, at the age of 86. He was buried in Valhalla Memorial Park Cemetery.

Partial filmography

Miracles for Sale (1939) - Dr. Sabbatt (as Frederic Worlock)
Lady of the Tropics (1939) - Colonel Demassey
Balalaika (1939) - Ramensky
The Earl of Chicago (1940) - Lord Elfie (uncredited)
Northwest Passage (1940) - Sir William Johnson (uncredited)
Strange Cargo (1940) - Grideau
The Sea Hawk (1940) - Darnell (uncredited)
He Stayed for Breakfast (1940) - Communist President (uncredited)
South of Suez (1940) - Defense Counsel
Moon Over Burma (1940) - Stephen Harmon
Murder Over New York (1940) - Hugh Drake
Hudson's Bay (1941) - English Governor
Free and Easy (1941) - Manager
Rage in Heaven (1941) - Solicitor-General
Man Hunt (1941) - Lord Gerald Risborough
Dr. Jekyll and Mr. Hyde (1941) - Dr. Heath
Down in San Diego (1941) - Eric Kramer (uncredited)
International Lady (1941) - Sir Henry
A Yank in the R.A.F. (1941) - Canadian Major
How Green Was My Valley (1941) - Dr. Richards
Captains of the Clouds (1942) - President of Court-Martial
Pacific Rendezvous (1942) - Dr. Jackwin
Eagle Squadron (1942) - Grenfall
Pierre of the Plains (1942) - Insp. Cannady
The Black Swan (1942) - Speaker of Assembly (uncredited)
Random Harvest (1942) - Margaret's Lawyer (uncredited)
London Blackout Murders (1943) - Eugene Caldwell
Sherlock Holmes in Washington (1943) - Radio Announcer (uncredited)
Air Raid Wardens (1943) - Otto
The Mantrap (1943) - Patrick Berwick
Thumbs Up (1943) - Kendrick (uncredited)
Appointment in Berlin (1943) - Von Ritter - Ministry of Information (uncredited)
Secret Service in Darkest Africa (1943, Serial) - Sir James Langley [Ch. 15]
Passport to Suez (1943) - Sir Robert Wembley (uncredited)
Sahara (1943) - Radio Newscaster (voice, uncredited)
Sherlock Holmes Faces Death (1943) - Geoffrey Musgrave
Madame Curie (1943) - Businessman (uncredited)
Jane Eyre (1943) - Sam—Waiter at Inn (uncredited)
The Lodger (1944) - Sir Edward Willoughby (uncredited)
Secrets of Scotland Yard (1944) - Mason
Wing and a Prayer (1944) - Admiral (uncredited)
National Velvet (1944) - Stewart (uncredited)
Hangover Square (1945) - Supt. Clay (uncredited)
The Picture of Dorian Gray (1945) - Francis (uncredited)
The Woman in Green (1945) - Onslow
The Fatal Witness (1945) - Sir Humphrey Mong
Scotland Yard Investigator (1945) - Col. Brent
Pursuit to Algiers (1945) - Prime Minister
Captain Kidd (1945) - Landers - Newgate Prison Governor (uncredited)
Terror by Night (1946) - Prof. William Kilbane
She-Wolf of London (1946) - Constable Ernie Hobbs
Dressed to Kill (1946) - Colonel Cavanaugh
The Locket (1946) - Doctor (uncredited)
The Macomber Affair (1947) - Clerk
The Imperfect Lady (1947) - Henderson
Last of the Redmen (1947) - Gen. Webb (uncredited)
Singapore (1947) - Cadum
Forever Amber (1947) - Actor (uncredited)
The Lone Wolf in London (1947) - Inspector Broome
Love from a Stranger (1947) - Inspector Hobday
A Double Life (1947) - Actor in 'Othello'
A Woman's Vengeance (1948) - Judge (uncredited)
Ruthless (1948) - J. Norton Sims
The Woman in White (1948) - Bernard (uncredited)
Johnny Belinda (1948) - Prosecutor (uncredited)
Joan of Arc (1948) - Duke of Bedford, England's Regent
Hills of Home (1948) - Dr. Weston
A Connecticut Yankee in King Arthur's Court (1949) - Mayor (uncredited)
Jet Over the Atlantic (1959) - Dean Halltree
Spartacus (1960) - Senator Laelius
One Hundred and One Dalmatians (1961) - Horace / Inspector Craven (voice)
The Notorious Landlady (1962) - Elderly Colonel (uncredited)
Strange Bedfellows (1965) - Mr. Martindale, Lawyer (uncredited)
Spinout (1966) - Blodgett
Airport (1970) - Frederick Williams - Passenger (uncredited) (final film role)

References

External links

 
 
 some portraits of Frederick Worlock(archived)

1886 births
1973 deaths
20th-century American male actors
20th-century British male actors
American male film actors
British male film actors
Burials at Valhalla Memorial Park Cemetery
Male actors from London
British emigrants to the United States